Sean White (born June 28, 1988) is a Canadian rugby union player. He plays as a scrum-half for the Canada national rugby union team. He made his debut for  against  in 2009.

White also played 32 tournaments on the World Rugby circuit from 2008 to 2016.

External links
2011 RWC Profile

1988 births
Living people
Canadian rugby union players
Canada international rugby union players
Rugby union scrum-halves
Sportspeople from Victoria, British Columbia
Commonwealth Games rugby sevens players of Canada
Canada international rugby sevens players
Rugby sevens players at the 2015 Pan American Games
Pan American Games gold medalists for Canada
Pan American Games medalists in rugby sevens
Rugby sevens players at the 2014 Commonwealth Games
Medalists at the 2015 Pan American Games
Medalists at the 2011 Pan American Games